Project Harar, charityregistered in the UK and Ethiopia works in Ethiopia to help children affected by cleft lip and palate and complex facial disfigurements. Since 2001 , nearly 10,000 children and young patients living in poverty and isolation were seen by a doctor through Project Harar.

Project Harar works in collaboration with Ethiopian and foreign specialists plastic, oral and maxillofacial surgeons to treat children affected by a variety of conditions, to give them normal facial function.

History 

Project Harar was founded after Jonathan Crown, a London-based Chartered Accountant and businessman on a photography vacation, encountered two young boys with facial disfigurements, Fhami and Jemal, begging in the town of Harar, eastern Ethiopia, in 2001. Moved to do something to help, Jonathan Crown spent months organising the trip that would bring Fhami and Jemal to The Gambia, where they received highly complex surgery on board of the M/V Anastasis operated by the charity Mercy Ships.

In 2006, the English actor John Hurt became Project Harar's first patron.

In autumn 2007, Project Harar was featured in two BBC World Service programmes on noma and the treatment of patients from remote regions. In November 2007, a documentary film made by BBC Inside Out featured a group of severely affected patients from the Hararghe and Somali regions of Ethiopia who underwent treatment by a team of UK medical volunteers, organised by the noma charity Facing Africa.

Operation 

Project Harar is a health outreach charity functioning as a bridge between those who could benefit from facial reconstructive surgery and the centralised Ethiopian health services. Its Ethiopian staff work in remote rural areas, liaising closely with local health administrators and extension workers, to locate and support children with facial disfigurements, who often face stigma and social exclusion.

Project Harar operates mainly in the Oromia Region, including the zones of Misraq (East) Hararghe and Mirab (West) Hararghe which take in the towns of Harar and Asebe Teferi, Amhara, Southern Nations Nationalities and Peoples Regions (SNNPR)South West Ethiopia Region (SWEPR) and Sidama.
The charity has also covered parts of the Somali Region, including Jijiga, and the chartered city of Dire Dawa.

Conditions treated 

Project Harar helps children and other individuals living with a treatable facial disfigurement, which can be caused by a number of conditions. These include:
cleft lip and palate
noma - a devastating form of gangrene that attacks the tissue of the face
tumour and ameloblastoma
animal attack injuries and bite wounds
burns and other accidental injuries

References 

Children's charities based in the United Kingdom
Foreign charities operating in Ethiopia
Hampstead
Health charities in the United Kingdom
Health in the London Borough of Camden
Medical and health organisations based in Ethiopia
Oral and maxillofacial surgery organizations
Organisations based in the London Borough of Camden
Plastic surgery organizations